The Emerged Democracy Party of British Columbia was a fringe political party in the province of British Columbia, Canada, formed in August 2004, with Tony Luck as leader

The party aimed to promote increased citizen participation in decision-making, and to promote more autonomy for British Columbia.

It nominated one candidate in the 2005 provincial election, Rob Norberg, who won 151 votes (0.85% of the total) in Surrey-Green Timbers riding.

The party was de-registered by Elections BC in June 2009.

See also

List of British Columbia general elections
2005 British Columbia general election

Provincial political parties in British Columbia
2009 disestablishments in British Columbia
2004 establishments in British Columbia
Political parties established in 2004
Political parties disestablished in 2009